Hindu is a village in Hiiumaa Parish, Hiiu County in northwestern Estonia.

The village is first mentioned in 1832 (Hindo). Historically, the village was part of Emmaste Manor.

1977–1997 the village was part of Sõru village.

References
 

Villages in Hiiu County